Zarif Khan (also known as Hot Tamale Louie; died 1964) was a Pakistani Pashtun American restaurant owner and investor. Khan operated a restaurant, Louie's in Sheridan, Wyoming, which served tamales, hamburgers, and other dishes. Khan was apprentice to the original owner, a German immigrant named Louis Menge, and kept the restaurant's name after Menge became a farmer in Montana.

Biography 
Born in the 1880s in the village of Bara, North-West Frontier Province, British India (now in Pakistan), Khan immigrated from colonial India to the United States in 1907 and eventually settled in Sheridan. He purchased the restaurant from a German immigrant named Louis Menge, and kept the restaurant's name, "Louie’s". The restaurant prospered and Khan became known as "Hot Tamale Louie".

Khan became a naturalized citizen of the United States in February 1926, but in December he was found racially ineligible (in accordance with United States v. Bhagat Singh Thind) and denaturalized. In 1954, Khan was re-granted citizenship following a second application.

In 1964, while on a family trip back to Bara, Khan was fatally stabbed by his grandnephew, Sultan Khan, over a dispute. Sultan was tried, found guilty and hanged in 1966. Khan was buried in Bara, while his wife Fatima returned to Sheridan and raised her children there.

Khan's wife sued for a larger portion of his estate after his death. Descendants of Khan still live in Wyoming.

References

1964 deaths
Year of birth missing
Indian emigrants to the United States
People with acquired American citizenship
People from Khyber District
People from Sheridan, Wyoming